The Magnolias may refer to:

Historic places
 The Magnolias (New Iberia, Louisiana), listed on the NRHP in Louisiana
 The Magnolias (Aberdeen, Mississippi), a Mississippi Landmark
 The Magnolias (Vicksburg, Mississippi), listed on the NRHP in Mississippi
 The Magnolias (Jefferson, Texas), listed on the NRHP in Texas

Other uses
 The Magnolias (band), an American indie rock band

See also
Magnolia (disambiguation)
Magnolia Plantation (disambiguation)